Sandy West (July 10, 1959 – October 21, 2006) was an American singer, drummer and songwriter. She was one of the founding members of the Runaways, the first teenage all-girl hard rock band to record and achieve widespread commercial success in the 1970s.

Early life 
Sandy (born Sandy Pesavento) was born in Long Beach, California. When she was 9 years old, her grandfather bought her a drum kit, and being an avid fan of rock and roll acts of the 1960s and 1970s, she began practicing rock music immediately and regularly. In 4th, 5th, and 6th grade, she was the drummer in the Prisk Elementary School orchestra. She proved to have a natural talent and quickly became a proficient drummer. By the age of 13, she was the only girl in local bands who played at teenage parties. Attended Edison High school in Huntington Beach California with actor Willie Aames, playing drums in school bands as Sandy Pesavento,  one of those bands was Witchcraft that featured Jimmy "Trash" Decker that later went on to form the punk band The Crowd in 1977.  At 15, she met Joan Jett and producer Kim Fowley co-created and formed the Runaways.

The Runaways 
Driven by her ambition to play professionally, she sought out fellow musicians and other industry contacts in southern California with the idea of forming an all-woman rock band. In 1975, she met producer Kim Fowley, who gave her the phone number of another young musician in the area, guitarist Joan Jett. Joan and Sandy met shortly thereafter. The women subsequently played for Fowley, who agreed to help them find other female musicians to round out the band, most notably Lita Ford and Cherie Currie.

Post-Runaways years 
After four years of recording and touring the world, the Runaways disbanded in April 1979. West made varied attempts to continue her career as a professional musician, playing with other acts in southern California, releasing a solo ep, The Beat is Back, and forming the Sandy West Band. None of these ventures produced significant income, so West was forced to spend most of her post-Runaways years working outside music. West later claimed that ex-Runaways' manager/producer Kim Fowley had not paid the members of the band what they were entitled to. "I owe him my introduction to the music business but he's also the reason I'm broke now," West said.

West appeared in Edgeplay: A Film About the Runaways, a documentary about the Runaways produced and directed by the band's former bassist Victory Tischler-Blue, providing some of the more poignant interview segments, describing the things she had to do post-Runaways for money. She worked mostly in construction, and spent a small amount of time as a bartender and a veterinary assistant. In other parts of the Edgeplay interviews, she alludes to having engaged in criminal activity in order to make ends meet (e.g., she describes how she had to break someone's arm for money they owed). West spent time in jail on multiple occasions following her career in the Runaways, which she alluded to in Edgeplay.

Death 
West died on October 21, 2006, at the age of 47 from lung cancer diagnosed a year before. West was never married and had no children.

Film 
Sandy West was portrayed by actress Stella Maeve in the 2010 film The Runaways. The film also featured Kristen Stewart, Dakota Fanning and Scout Taylor-Compton, who portrayed Joan Jett, Cherie Currie and Lita Ford, respectively. During the audio commentary during the DVD extras, Joan Jett dedicated the film to her.

Legacy 
Time Magazine described West as a "pioneering rock drummer".

Discography 
Runaways albums

 The Runaways (1976)
Queens of Noise (1977)
Live in Japan (1977)
Waitin' for the Night (1977)
And Now... The Runaways (international release title) (1978)
Flaming Schoolgirls ("odds-and-sods" compilation) (1980)
Little Lost Girls (re-sequenced U.S. version of And Now... The Runaways), (1981)
Born to be Bad (early demos compilation) (1993)
20th Century Masters – The Millennium Collection: The Best of The Runaways (1999)

Post-Runaways releases
 7" – F-13
 4 song tape
 The Beat is Back

References

External links 

 Official Runaways site

 Sandy West memorial & tribute show December 9, 2006.
 BBC News (England) Obituary notice
 CBC News (Canada) Obituary notice
 

1959 births
2006 deaths
20th-century American singers
American women drummers
American rock drummers
American rock singers
Deaths from brain cancer in the United States
Deaths from lung cancer in California
American heavy metal drummers
Musicians from Long Beach, California
Songwriters from California
The Runaways members
Third-wave feminism
20th-century American women singers
20th-century American drummers